The Colt Mustang is a line of two lightweight, single-action pocket pistols chambered for the .380 ACP cartridge, produced by Colt's Manufacturing Company. The firearm line was produced from 1983 to 1996 as the Colt Mustang  and from 2011 to present the Mustang was reintroduced along with an alloy frame model and an updated polymer frame version, the Colt Mustang XSP.

Brief history
In 1983, Colt introduced the Colt Mark IV/ Series 80 Government Model -.380 Auto. This pocket pistol was similar in appearance, but not design, to the Colt M1911. The Government Model .380's obvious aesthetic difference being that it is scaled down to roughly 78 percent to that of a full-sized M1911 Government Model. From the factory the .380 Government Model came with a capacity of 7+1.
In 1986, Colt introduced a simplified version of their .380 with a shortened barrel, slide, and gripframe, holding two fewer rounds and sold it as the Mustang.
In 1987, the Pocket Light version was introduced boosting the popularity because of the reduced weight of the weapon.
In 1988, the Mustang Plus II was introduced and it had the longer gripframe of the original Government Model.  The Mustang Plus II derived its name from holding 2 more rounds in its magazine than the original Mustang. 
In a number of years, Colt changed their spring and follower in the Mustang magazine, increasing its capacity to 6.
In 1993, the Night Light .380 was introduced with Bar Dot Tritium night sights. 
In 1996, Colt added a blued steel frame or stainless version. In 2011, Colt reintroduced the previously discontinued Mustang Pocketlite, along with the Colt Mustang XSP in 2013, a polymer frame version with updated design.

See also

References

External links
http://www.colt.com/Catalog/Pistols/380Mustang%C2%AE.aspx
https://web.archive.org/web/20140430083428/http://www.gunsandammo.com/reviews/colt-mustang-xsp-review/
Colt pistol model Mustang (infographic drawing)
Colt pistol model Mustang II PLUS (infographic drawing)

Colt semi-automatic pistols
.380 ACP semi-automatic pistols
Weapons and ammunition introduced in 1983